Binibining Pilipinas 2015 was the 52nd edition of Binibining Pilipinas. It took place at the Smart Araneta Coliseum in Quezon City, Metro Manila, Philippines on March 15, 2015.

At the end of the event, Mary Jean Lastimosa crowned Pia Wurtzbach as Miss Universe Philippines 2015, Bianca Guidotti crowned Janicel Lubina as Binibining Pilipinas International 2015, Kris Tiffany Janson crowned Christi McGarry as Binibining Pilipinas Intercontinental 2015, Yvethe Marie Santiago crowned Rogelie Catacutan as Binibining Pilipinas Supranational 2015, and Parul Shah crowned Ann Colis as Binibining Pilipinas Tourism 2015. Hannah Ruth Sison was named 1st Runner-Up while Kimverlyn Suiza was named 2nd Runner-Up.

Results
Color keys
  The contestant Won in an International pageant.
  The contestant was a Runner-up in an International pageant.
  The contestant was a Semi-Finalist in an International pageant.

Special Awards

Judges 

 Leila De Lima – Secretary of the Department of Justice
 Kiefer Ravena – Basketball player from the Ateneo Blue Eagles
 Vice Ganda – TV presenter, actor, and entertainer
 Bernd Schneider – General Manager of the Sofitel Philippine Plaza
 Sarah Meier – TV host, model
 Frederick Go – President and COO of Robinsons Land Corporation
 Gen. Gregorio Pio Catapang – Chief of Staff of the Armed Forces of the Philippines
 H.E. Luis Lillo – Ambassador of Chile to the Philippines
 H.E. Gilles Garachon – Ambassador of France to the Philippines
 Cong. Leni Robredo – Member of the House of Representatives from Camarines Sur's 3rd district

Contestants
34 contestants competed for the six titles.

Notes

Post-pageant Notes 

 Pia Wurtzbach competed at Miss Universe 2015 in Las Vegas, Nevada, where she emerged as the winner. Wurtzbach ended the Philippines' 42-year title drought.
 Janicel Lubina competed at Miss International 2015 in Tokyo, Japan where she finished as one of the Top 10 finalists. Lubina also won the Miss Best Dresser award. On the other hand, Rogelie Catacutan competed at Miss Supranational 2015 in Krynica, Poland where she finished as one of the Top 20 semifinalists.
 After being appointed as Binibining Pilipinas Grand International 2015, Parul Shah competed at Miss Grand International 2015 in Bangkok, Thailand and was named Third Runner-Up. After being appointed as Binibining Pilipinas Globe 2015, Ann Colis was crowned as the winner of Miss Globe 2015 held in Toronto, Canada.
 Christi McGarry competed again at Miss Intercontinental in Magdeburg, Germany and was named First Runner-Up. McGarry was also awarded as the Continental Queen of Asia and Oceania.
 Kylie Verzosa competed again at Binibining Pilipinas in 2016 and was crowned Binibining Pilipinas International 2016. She competed at Miss International 2016 in Tokyo, Japan and emerged as the winner.
 Teresita Ssen Marquez later competed at Miss World Philippines 2017 where she was crowned as Reina Hispanoamericana Filipinas 2017. She competed at Reina Hispanoamericana 2017 in Santa Cruz, Bolivia where she emerged as the winner. Marquez was the first Asian to be crowned Reina Hispanoamericana.

References

External links
 Binibining Pilipinas Official website

2015
2015 beauty pageants